Bill Miller (born 22 July 1954), is a former Labour MEP representing Glasgow and Scotland.

Personal life
Miller was brought up in Gartocharn and was educated at Paisley Technical College and Kingston Polytechnic. He was a chartered surveyor by profession and is married with one son and one daughter.

Political life
Miller was chairman of the Glasgow Labour Party between 1984 and 1987 as well as acting as an election agent and was assistant secretary of the Glasgow branch of Nalgo between 1980 and 1986.

He served as a Strathclyde Regional Councillor (from 1984 to 1994), chairing the council's Economic and Industrial Development Committee.

He was elected to the European Parliament, He represented the Glasgow constituency from 1994 to 1999 and the Scotland constituency from 1999 to 2004, when he was not re-elected, having been relegated to third on Labour's regional list, a position that he described as a "walk-on part."

In the Parliament, Miller served as Labour Party Whip and was a member of the Parliament's Economic, Monetary and Industrial Affairs Committee and the delegation for ASEAN, South East Asia and Korea. He had also been a vice-chair of the European Parliament's legal affairs and internal market committee.

He was described by the Financial Times as a "Glasgow bruiser."

Since losing his seat in the European Parliament, Miller has continued to seek a Parliamentary seat to continue his political career. He has also worked for the Scottish Funding Council (the body which funds colleges).

External links
Speeches in the European Parliament

1954 births
Living people
Alumni of Kingston University
Scottish Labour councillors
Scottish Labour MEPs
MEPs for Scotland 1994–1999
MEPs for Scotland 1999–2004
Scottish trade unionists